The Three Sisters are a chain of three islands within the Canadian waters of Lake Huron, located  east of Algoma Mills, Ontario in Algoma District.

References 

Lake islands of Ontario
Islands of Lake Huron in Ontario
Archipelagoes of Canada